Roman William Cress (born August 2, 1977, in Kaven) is a track athlete from the Marshall Islands. He was born to an American father and Marshallese mother. Cress attended South High School and participated in Track as a student. He then attended MCTC, transferred to St. Thomas for his bachelor's degree and participated in Track as a student athlete.

Cress has won the bronze medal in the 100 metres sprint at the 2006 Micronesia Games and gold in the 200 metres event at the same Games. He was the first Marshallese track athlete in history to compete in the Olympic Games, representing his country at the 2008 Summer Olympics in Beijing. At the 100 metres he finished 8th in his heat in a time of 11.18 seconds He is currently a school administrator at Robbinsdale Middle School in Robbinsdale, Minnesota.

Achievements

See also
 Marshall Islands at the 2008 Summer Olympics

References

External links
 
Sports reference biography

1977 births
Living people
Marshallese male sprinters
Athletes (track and field) at the 2008 Summer Olympics
Olympic track and field athletes of the Marshall Islands
People from the Ratak Chain
Marshallese people of American descent
World Athletics Championships athletes for the Marshall Islands